Tohoru Masamune (born 18 November 1959) is a Japanese–American actor. His roles include Shredder in the 2014 Michael Bay film Teenage Mutant Ninja Turtles, Kevin Hall-Yoshida (Paxton's dad) in Never Have I Ever, and Inception.

Early life
Masamune was born in Madison, Wisconsin, on November 18, 1959, the son of Japanese parents, Satoru and Takako Masumune (née Nozoe). He spent his childhood in Edmonton, Alberta, Canada. His father, Satoru Masamune, was a top researcher, and Arthur C, Cope professor of chemistry at Massachusetts Institute of Technology, and his maternal grandfather, Tetsuo Nozoe, was a world-renowned scientist in Japan. His great-grandfather was Juichi Nozoe, a lawyer and politician who was a one-time member of the Japanese National Diet (House of Representatives)
His paternal grandfather's cousin was noted Japanese literary figure (novelist and playwright), Hakucho Masamune 

Tohoru Masamune graduated from Massachusetts Institute of Technology.

Career
In 1990, he debuted in the film Pacific Heights directed by Academy Award winner, John Schlesinger.

In 1994, he played Ling in Bigfoot: The Unforgettable Encounter. He appeared in the film Inception with the first line of the movie directed by Christopher Nolan, opposite Leonardo DiCaprio and Ken Watanabe. In 2014, he played Oroku Saki / The Shredder in the reboot feature film Teenage Mutant Ninja Turtles. In its 2016 sequel, he is replaced by actor Brian Tee.

He also played Haruto Yakimura in Marvel Studios's superhero television series Agents of S.H.I.E.L.D., and appears in the role of Martin Takagi in the paranormal thriller feature film Chatter. He also provided the voice of Chef Haruki in TBS adult animated series American Dad!, Kira Kozu in an episode of the DreamWorks/Nickelodeon animated series Kung Fu Panda: Legends of Awesomeness and Sensei in Disney's Club Penguin online shorts.

He played the starring role of Dr. Matt Lin in the 2019 Primetime Emmy Award and 2019 Peabody Award-winning series, ARTIFICIAL on Twitch. 

On stage, he has played starring roles under the direction of Tony Award winner Mary Zimmerman at the Goodman Theater, and Tony Award winner Daniel J. Sullivan at the Williamstown Theatre Festival in a premiere of Far East (play) written by Pulitzer Prize-nominated playwright A.R. Gurney.

As a voice actor, he has appeared in guest roles in animated cartoons such as American Dad!, We Bare Bears, and Kung Fu Panda: Legends of Awesomeness.

Filmography

Film

Television

Video games

References

External links
 

1959 births
American male film actors
American male television actors
American male voice actors
American film actors of Asian descent
Actors from Madison, Wisconsin
Male actors from Wisconsin
20th-century American male actors
21st-century American male actors
American male actors of Japanese descent
MIT School of Humanities, Arts, and Social Sciences alumni
Living people